The Te Naihi River is a river of the Otago region of New Zealand's South Island. Much of the river's length is within Mount Aspiring National Park.

See also
List of rivers of New Zealand

References

Rivers of Otago
Mount Aspiring National Park
Rivers of New Zealand